Aishwarya Sridhar (Hindi: ऐश्वर्या श्रीधर born 12 January) is an Indian wildlife photographer, wildlife presenter, and documentary filmmaker residing in Navi Mumbai. She is the youngest girl to have won the Sanctuary Asia- Young Naturalist Award and the International Camera Fair. Award. In 2020, Aishwarya became the first Indian woman to win Wildlife Photographer of the Year award. She is also a member of the State Wetland Identification Committee appointed by the Bombay High Court. Her works have been featured in BBC Wildlife, The Guardian, Sanctuary Asia, Saevus, Hindustan Times, Mumbai Mirror, Digital Camera, Mathrubhumi and Mongabay.

She has received numerous awards for her contribution towards nature including the 'Diana Award' and 'Woman Icon India Award' from the Governor of Tamil Nadu. Aishwarya is also actively involved in environmental conservation.

Education and career 
Aishwarya was born on 12 January, and grew up in Mumbai, India. She is the daughter of Sridhar Ranganathan and Rani Sridhar to a Tamil family. She was a student of The Dr. Pillai Global Academy and was the world topper in Business Studies paper in Cambridge International Examinations in 2013. She is a mass media graduate from Mumbai University.

Her father is a member of the Bombay Natural History Society (BNHS) and Aishwarya used to accompany him on treks to various forests. Her love for photography started when she was 13. From an early age, Aishwarya started trekking in the jungles of Ratnagiri in Maharashtra. Her debut documentary 'Panje-The Last Wetland' was telecast on DD National in 2018. It was about conserving the last remaining wetland of Uran named Panje. The film helped bring a Bombay High Court order to stop the reclamation of the wetland.

She has also made a feature film on a wild Bengal Tigress named Maya titled 'The Queen of Taru' which received the Best Amateur Film Award at the 9th Wildlife Conservation Film Festival (WCFF), New York City.
Apart from filmmaking and photography, Aishwarya is also a poet and a writer.

Awards and recognition 

2011

 Sanctuary Asia’s Young Naturalist Award
2013

 World Topper in Cambridge International Exams

2014

 World Sparrow Day Photography and Poem competition- 2nd prize.

2016

 International Camera Fair Award

2018

 Young Digital Camera Photographer of the Year-Winner-Small World

2019

 Princess Diana Award

2019

 Woman Icon India Award 
2020

 Jackson Wild Fellowship
 Wildlife Photographer of the Year by Natural History Museum, London

Films

References 

Living people
1997 births
Indian wildlife photographers
Photographers from Maharashtra
Indian documentary filmmakers
People from Mumbai
Cambridge International Examinations
Indian women photographers